Martin Rennie (born 9 May 1994) is a Scottish professional footballer who plays for Clyde. He previously played for Montrose over two spells either side of a season with St Patrick's Athletic in the League of Ireland Premier Division. He has also had loan spells at 
Berwick Rangers and Open Goal Broomhill.

Club career

Early career
Rennie began playing his youth football with Inverkeithing Hillfield Swifts. From there he went on to play at amateur level for Kirkcaldy YM before signing for Lochgelly Albert in 2016.

Montrose
Having impressed at Junior level for Lochgelly Albert where he had scored 17 goals in half a season, Rennie was signed by Scottish League Two leaders Montrose on an 18 month contract on 19 January 2018. His first career goal at senior level came on 17 February 2018 in a 2–2 draw, scoring a 75th minute equaliser just one minute after being substituted on. After scoring 4 goals in 11 games as Montrose became Scottish League Two champions and earning promotion to Scottish League One, Rennie signed a new 2 year contract with the club on 28 July 2018. He won Scottish League One Player of the Month for December 2018, with his manager Stewart Petrie receiving the Manager of the Month award. Rennie's first full season in senior football was a success on a personal level as he made 44 appearances in all competitions, scoring 14 goals and on 5 May 2019, he was named Montrose Young Player of the Year for the season. The 2019–20 season proved to be a quieter one for Rennie as by January he had made just 11 appearances and scoring 2 goals amidst transfer interest from other clubs.

St Patrick's Athletic
On 24 January 2020, it was announced that Rennie had signed for League of Ireland Premier Division side St Patrick's Athletic, who's assistant manager Pat Cregg recommended him to manager Stephen O'Donnell having been a teammate of Rennie's at Montrose until earlier in the season. The transfer cost the Dublin club a five figure sum, which saw Rennie become Montrose's first ever international transfer. Having joined the club in the middle of pre-season, he integrated into the team quickly, scoring his first goal in a 6–1 pre-season friendly win over Athlone Town on 29 January. He made his competitive debut on 14 February 2020, playing the full 90 minutes as his side lost 1–0 against Waterford in the opening game of the season at Richmond Park. After 11 appearances in all competitions without a goal, it was announced on 3 October 2020 that Rennie had left the club by mutual consent.

Return to Montrose
On 5 October 2020, it was announced that Rennie had returned to his old club Montrose on transfer deadline day. He made his first appearance since returning to the club 2 days later in a Scottish League Cup game with Scottish Premiership side Ross County, with Rennie missing a penalty in the shootout as Montrose lost after coming from 3–0 down to take the game to penalties. Rennie ended a streak of 30 appearances without a goal on 4 May 2021 when he opened the scoring in a 3–2 win over Partick Thistle for his first goal since December 2019. Rennie struggled with injury the following season but made his comeback in Montrose’s 6-4 play-off final defeat; with Rennie scoring a goal in extra-time. 

Rennie, in search of game time was sent out on loan to Berwick Rangers but was quickly recalled during parent club’s Montrose injury crisis. On his first game back he scored in a 3-0 victory over Kelty Hearts. He was then sent out on loan to Open Goal Broomhill.

On 17 January 2023, Rennie was released by Montrose.

Clyde
On 18 January 2023, Rennie signed an 18-month contract with Scottish League One club Clyde.

Career statistics

Honours

Club
Scottish League Two: (1)
Montrose — 2017–18

Individual
Scottish League One Player of the Month: (1)
December 2018
Montrose Young Player of the Year: (1)
2018–19

References

External links
 
 
 

1994 births
Living people
Footballers from Kirkcaldy
Montrose F.C. players
Scottish Football League players
Scottish Professional Football League players
St Patrick's Athletic F.C. players
League of Ireland players
Association football forwards
Scottish footballers
Scottish expatriate footballers
Expatriate association footballers in the Republic of Ireland
Inverkeithing Hillfield Swifts F.C. players
Clyde F.C. players